George Kibbler ( – ) was an English professional rugby league footballer who played in the 1920s.

References

External links

 Search for "Kibbler" at rugbyleagueproject.org
 Ex-Leeds Footballer - Kibbler, of Bradford Northern Club, Dies in Infirmary

1900s births
1929 deaths
Bradford Bulls players
English rugby league players
Huddersfield Giants players
Leeds Rhinos players
Rugby league players from Leeds
Rugby league second-rows
Yorkshire rugby league team players